Girl Seeks Father is a 1959 Soviet children's drama film that was produced by Yuri Bulychyov at the Belarusfilm,  directed by  Lev Golub, and which stars  Anna Kamenkova, Vladimir Guskov, Nikolai Barmin. Writers: Konstantin Gubarevich, Yevgeny Ryss. In 1959, it was the fifth film in Soviet Union in terms of the box office. It was watched by over 35 million spectators, which makes it the third watched Belarusian film ever.

Plot
The film was set in Russia during World War II and is about a 5-year-old girl searching for her partisan leader father while escaping from the Nazis. 
Nazis, trying to catch 5 years old girl to make her their hostage, because her father is the Soviet partisan commander, and young boy trying to save her. For some time, when little baby was lost in the forest alone or when Nazis finally caught two children your hope is almost broken.

Cast
Credited cast
Anna Kamenkova	as Lena		
Vladimir Guskov	as Yanka, forester's grandson
Nikolai Barmin		as Panas	
Vladimir Dorofeyev	as forester		
Anna Yegorova	as 	Praskovya Ivanovna
Yevgeni  Grigorev	as 	Konstantin Lvovich, Medical Assistant	
Nina Grebeshkova	as	Anya	
Konstantin Bartashevich	as Gunter, German Commandant
Rest of cast
Viktor Uralsky	as partisan Volodya
Yevgeni  Polosin	as The Headmen  
Ivan Shatillo	as Commissar

Awards
 Mar del Plata International Film Festival ,    3° Edition  1960. Best Child Performance (Anna Kamenkova).
 The 25th Annual Bengal Film Journalists' Association,  1962 . Ten Best Foreign Films.

References

External links
 

1950s children's drama films
1959 films
1950s Russian-language films
Soviet children's films
Soviet drama films
Russian children's drama films
Films based on Russian novels
Belarusfilm films
Eastern Front of World War II films
Partisan films